In Memory Of may refer to:

 In Memory Of (Law & Order), an episode of the TV series Law & Order
 In Memory Of... (D:Ream album), 2011
 In Memory Of (Stanley Turrentine album)
 In Memory Of ... (ballet), a ballet by the New York City Ballet
 "In Memory Of..." (song), a 2012 sing by Drowning Pool

See also
 "Harry Patch (In Memory Of)", a song by Radiohead